During the 1963–64 English football season, Everton F.C. competed in the Football League First Division.

Final league table

Results

Charity Shield

Football League First Division

FA Cup

European Cup

Squad

References

1963–64
Everton F.C. season